El Ayote is a municipality in the South Caribbean Coast Autonomous Region of Nicaragua. The population is 5,406.

Municipalities of the South Caribbean Coast Autonomous Region